James Stephen Quinn (born 15 December 1974) is a former professional footballer. A forward, his final club was Northampton Town. He played for numerous clubs in his career, and was also a Northern Ireland international. He is currently assistant manager at Solihull Moors.

Club career
After four league games with Birmingham City, Coventry-born Quinn was sold to Second Division Blackpool for  £25,000. He scored a total of 47 goals and made 150 first-team starts over five years. Two of those goals were scored against Chelsea in the League Cup second round. On 12 August 1995, he opened the scoring in Blackpool's game at Bristol City after eleven seconds, equalling the club's fastest-ever goal by Bill Slater at Stoke City 46 years earlier.

These exploits led West Bromwich Albion to sign Quinn for £500,000. He made his Albion debut in a 1–1 home draw against Bury on 21 February 1998. He scored twice in a 2–1 win over Middlesbrough on 4 April 1998, his first goals for the club; however, he found goals hard to come by during his Baggies career, scoring just ten times in 123 appearances in all competitions.

During 2001–02, Quinn was loaned out to Notts County, but returned to the Hawthorns when a permanent deal could not be agreed. He was then loaned out again, to Bristol Rovers, where he scored once against Kidderminster Harriers. In the days following Albion's promotion to the Premier League in April 2002, Quinn found himself surplus to requirements and was released. A few days later he moved to Dutch side Willem II.

Quinn was released by Willem II in January 2005. He had been unhappy with his life in the Netherlands, and set about finding a new club in England whilst training with the MK Dons. He quickly became Paul Sturrock's first permanent signing for Sheffield Wednesday, joining on a short-term contract until the end of the season. After scoring two goals in fifteen appearances during four months at Hillsborough, Quinn signed for Peterborough United in August 2005. In October of the same year he went on a month's loan to Bristol City, scoring on his debut against Oldham Athletic.

He signed for Northampton Town in August 2006, scoring his first and what turned out to be only goal for the club against Brighton on 21 October 2006. On 21 December 2006, a poor start to the season saw him placed on the transfer list alongside Andy Kirk and Scott McGleish. In March 2007 Quinn joined Scunthorpe United on loan for the remainder of the season. He was an unused substitute for the Iron on several occasions, but did not experience any first-team action.

Quinn retired from playing football on 11 September 2007, due to his failure to break back into the Northern Ireland team.

International career
Quinn collected fifty caps for Northern Ireland, and scored goals against Belgium, Luxembourg, Malta and Serbia & Montenegro.

International career
Scores and results list Northern Ireland's goal tally first

Coaching career
Quinn took up coaching after the end of his playing days and passed part 1 of the UEFA 'A' Licence in 2009, and in 2010 was coaching youth football in Princeton, New Jersey. In 2012 Quinn returned to England to become a scout with Luton Town FC, before coming back to Princeton NJ in January 2013 to become the Director of U15-U18 College Showcasing for Princeton Soccer Association.

He obtained the UEFA Pro Licence in 2012 and in 2013 was appointed Head Coach of USL Premier Development League side Central Jersey Spartans, shortly before their dissolution.

In the summer of 2015, he joined National League team, Tranmere Rovers, as first-team coach under new manager Gary Brabin. Following a short spell coaching in America he returned to England and in August 2018 he was appointed as the first-team coach at National League club Solihull Moors, working alongside Tim Flowers.

References

External links

Profile - James Quinn Irish FA
Profile - James Quinn UpThePosh! The Peterborough United Database

1974 births
Living people
Footballers from Coventry
Association footballers from Northern Ireland
Northern Ireland international footballers
Association football forwards
Birmingham City F.C. players
Blackpool F.C. players
Stockport County F.C. players
West Bromwich Albion F.C. players
Notts County F.C. players
Bristol Rovers F.C. players
Willem II (football club) players
Sheffield Wednesday F.C. players
Peterborough United F.C. players
Bristol City F.C. players
Northampton Town F.C. players
Scunthorpe United F.C. players
English Football League players
Eredivisie players
English expatriate sportspeople in the Netherlands
English expatriates in the United States
Expatriate association footballers from Northern Ireland
English people of Irish descent